James L. Lester Jr. (January 12, 1932 – February 17, 2020) was an American politician. He served as a Democratic member for the 23rd district of the Georgia State Senate.

Life and career 
Lester was born in Richmond County, Georgia, the son of Elizabeth Miles and William McMorris. He attended Richmond Academy and The Citadel, graduating the latter in 1952.

After graduating, Lester served in the United States Army during the Korean War as a lieutenant. He was discharged in 1954, after which he attended the University of Georgia School of Law, where he earned his Juris Doctor degree in 1957.

Lester worked with his father at a law firm. In 1971, he was elected to represent the 23rd district of the Georgia State Senate. Lester served until 1985, when he was succeeded by Frank Albert.

Lester died in February 2020, at the age of 88.

References 

1932 births
2020 deaths
People from Richmond County, Georgia
Democratic Party Georgia (U.S. state) state senators
20th-century American politicians
University of Georgia School of Law alumni
The Citadel, The Military College of South Carolina alumni